Yves Rebelle (born 5 March 1952) is a French rowing coxswain. He competed in the men's eight event at the 1972 Summer Olympics.

References

1952 births
Living people
French male rowers
Olympic rowers of France
Rowers at the 1972 Summer Olympics
Place of birth missing (living people)
Coxswains (rowing)